Sanval may refer to:

 Sanval, India, a village in India
 Sanval, brand name of the drug Zolpidem